Coulterophytum is a genus of flowering plants belonging to the family Apiaceae.

Its native range is Western Mexico.

Species:

Coulterophytum holwayi 
Coulterophytum laxum 
Coulterophytum macrophyllum 
Coulterophytum pubescens

References

Apioideae
Apioideae genera